Golden Gardens Park is a public park in Ballard, a neighborhood of Seattle, Washington. The park includes wetlands, beaches, hiking trails, and picnic and playground areas. The park's bathhouse was designated a historic landmark by the City of Seattle in 2005.

Landmarks
The park's bathhouse was designated a historic landmark by the City of Seattle in 2005.

Recreation 
The lower portion of the park is divided between wetland marsh and beach (on Puget Sound), and situated north of the Shilshole Bay Marina. It also has dunes and large grassy areas. Golden Gardens has exceptional views of Puget Sound and the Olympic Mountains across the sound.
The water is very cold for swimming even in summers. Sailing, kayaking, and canoeing are popular. Kitesurfing and sailboarding and other wind-driven sports are also common. The Sound is cut off from the open ocean for more than a hundred miles, sheltering the park from severe weather.

The park is also host to fire pits, picnic areas, a play area, a basketball court, and walking and hiking paths.

Nature
Golden Gardens is well known for the birds that live or migrate there:
 Mallard ducks in the wetlands
 Red-winged blackbirds in the marshes
 Canada geese are seen in the parking lot and near picnic areas
 Wood ducks make occasional appearances
 Bald Eagles commonly occur here
 Glaucous-winged Gulls are common
 Anna's hummingbirds can often be seen on the trees near the ponds.
The mallards and Canada geese are habituated to humans, and have been known to attack visitors.
California sea lions are often heard, and Harbor Seals are also commonly seen.
Red-eared slider turtles can be seen sunning themselves on the logs in the ponds.
Beavers are active at the ponds, they have cut down a lot of the alder trees around the ponds.
Musk rats can often be seen swimming in the ponds. Orcas sometimes swim near the beach.

References

External links 

 Official website

Ballard, Seattle
Beaches of Washington (state)
Environmental issues in Washington (state)
Natural history of Washington (state)
Parks in Seattle